The Last Days of Winter is a 2011 Iranian documentary directed by Mehrdad Oskouei.

Production 
It took Oskouei four years to obtain the permit necessary to make the documentary, and he only had 12 days to actually film.

Festivals 
 24th IDFA, International Documentary Film Festival Amsterdam 2011, The Netherlands. « Reflecting Images: Panorama & DOC U section ».
 International Documentary Edge Film Festival, Auckland and Wellington, New Zealand, 2012
 Middle East Now Film Festival, Florence, Italy, 2012
 7th International Oriental Film Festival in Geneva, Switzerland, 2012.
 11th Documentary Film Festival in Lasalle – Cévennes, France, 2012
 6th Filem’on, International Children's Film Festival, Brussels, Belgium. 2012
 12th "Escales Documentaires", La Rochelle, France, 2012.
 Documentary Film Month at the ancient chapel of the Abbey of Aniane, France, 2012
 21st "Traces de Vies" Festival, Clermont Ferrand, France, 2012.
 Black Movie Film Festival, Geneva, Switzerland, 2013
 Atmosphères 53, 5ème Festival du Film Judiciaire de Laval, France, 2013
 3ème Festival Documentaire "Enfance dans le monde", Paris, France, 2013.
 3rd Prague, Iranian Film Festival, Czech Republic. 8–12 January 2014
 13th True/False Film Festival, Columbia, Missouri, US. 3–6 March 2016.

Awards
 Winner of Blackberry IDFA Doc U Award 2011
 Winner of Golden FIFOG for best documentary at the 7th International Oriental Film Festival in Geneva, 2012.
 Winner of Youth Selection Award at the 12th Escales Documentaires, La Rochelle, France, 2012.
 Winner of Jury's Special Mention at the 22nd Traces de Vies International Documentary Film Festival, France 2012.

Reviews
Taylor Wanbaugh of VOX Magazine called The Last Days of Winter "a fantastic examination of the human spirit." He added, "It’s easy to forget where these boys are and all they’ve had to go through in their short lives, but their big brown eyes tell the tales of their sadness."

References

External links
 

Iranian documentary films